Hichem Sofiane Salaouatchi (born 26 August 1983) is the Algerian Minister of Fishing and Fishery Productions. He was appointed as minister on 7 July 2021.

Education 
Salaouatchi holds a Bachelor in Accounting from the University of Algiers 3, a Master in Management from the University of Blida and a Doctorate in Management from the University of Algiers 3.

References

External links 

 Ministry of Fishing and Fishery Productions

1983 births
Living people
21st-century Algerian politicians
Algerian politician stubs
Algerian politicians
Government ministers of Algeria

University of Algiers alumni